The 2016 Indianapolis Colts season was the franchise's 64th season in the National Football League and the 33rd in Indianapolis. The Colts matched their 8–8 record from 2015, but would miss the playoffs in consecutive seasons for the first time since 1997–1998. This season would also see the Colts get swept by the Houston Texans for the first time in franchise history. As a result, the Colts fired general manager Ryan Grigson after five seasons with the team. However, head coach Chuck Pagano would return the next year.

Roster changes

Free agents

Undrafted free agents
Sources

Draft

Notes
 The Colts traded their sixth-round selection to the Oakland Raiders in exchange for linebacker Sio Moore.

Staff

Final roster

Schedule

Preseason
On February 16, the NFL announced that the Colts would play the Green Bay Packers in the Pro Football Hall of Fame Game. The game would have occurred on Sunday, August 7, at Tom Benson Hall of Fame Stadium in Canton, Ohio, but the game was cancelled due to field conditions. However, the two teams met during the regular season in Green Bay.

The remainder of the Colts' preseason opponents and schedule were later announced on April 7.

Regular season

Note: Intra-division opponents are in bold text.

Game summaries

Week 1: vs. Detroit Lions

Andrew Luck would march the Colts down the field and score with 39 seconds remaining, but the Lions were able to pull out the win on a field goal by Matt Prater with 4 seconds left. The Colts would try the lateral play on the ensuing kickoff, but it would result in a safety. With the loss, the Colts started 0–1.

Week 2: at Denver Broncos

It was only a 3–3 game at the end of 1 quarter before CJ Anderson scored a 4-yard touchdown to take a 7-point lead. The teams would trade field goals to end the half with a 13–6 advantage for the Broncos. Robert Turbin would score a touchdown from 5 yards out to tie the game at 13. But from there, it was basically all Denver. Indy was outscored 21-7 after Turbin's touchdown, including a pick six by Aqib Talib and a scoop and score by Shane Ray off a Von Miller strip sack of Andrew Luck. Brandon McManus would also kick two field goals in that stretch as the Broncos advanced to 2-0 and the Colts fell to 0–2.

Week 3: vs. San Diego Chargers

Although the Colts took an early lead in the first quarter, the Chargers kept the game close and a Josh Lambo field goal put them ahead midway through the fourth quarter; however, a 63-yard pass from Andrew Luck to T. Y. Hilton restored the Colts' advantage with less than a minute remaining, giving them their first win of the season. With the win, the Colts improved to 1–2.

Week 4: at Jacksonville Jaguars
NFL International Series
With the loss, the Colts fell to 1–3.

Week 5: vs. Chicago Bears
With the win, the Colts improved to 2–3.

Week 6: at Houston Texans

The Colts led 23–9 with less than three minutes to play, but a comeback by the Texans forced overtime, where they would win on a field goal. With the loss, the Colts fell to 2–4.

Week 7: at Tennessee Titans

With the win, the Colts improved to 3–4. They also picked up their 10th straight win over the Titans.

Week 8: vs. Kansas City Chiefs

In a rematch of the 2013 wildcard game, the Chiefs blew out the Colts easily, 30–14. With the loss, the Colts fell to 3–5.

Week 9: at Green Bay Packers

This was the Colts' first victory at Lambeau Field since 1988.

Week 11: vs. Tennessee Titans

With their 11th straight win over the Titans, the Colts improved to 5–5.

Week 12: vs. Pittsburgh SteelersThanksgiving Day game'''

Quarterback Andrew Luck did not play due to a concussion, and his replacement Scott Tolzien was unable to prevent a 28–7 defeat, although he did throw a five-yard touchdown pass to Donte Moncrief early in the second quarter.

Week 13: at New York Jets
With the win, the Colts evened their record at 6-6.

Week 14: vs. Houston Texans

With the loss, the Colts fell to 6–7 and were swept by the Texans for the first time in franchise history.

Week 15: at Minnesota Vikings
With the win, the Colts improved to 7-7 and remained just in the thick of the playoff race.

Week 16: at Oakland Raiders

With the loss, the Colts fell to 7–8 and were officially eliminated from playoff contention for the second year in a row.

Week 17: vs. Jacksonville Jaguars

The Jaguars took a 17–0 lead during the second quarter, but the Colts were able to pull it back to 17–17 as the game moved into its final period. The Jaguars regained the lead with a 41-yard Jason Myers field goal inside the two-minute warning, but Andrew Luck led the Colts on a 75-yard drive that culminated with a 1-yard touchdown pass to Jack Doyle with four seconds remaining. With the win, the Colts ended their year 8–8 and snapped their two-game losing streak against the Jaguars.

Standings

Division

Conference

References

External links
 

Indianapolis
Indianapolis Colts seasons
Indianapolis Colts